Pachystola mamillata is a species of beetle in the family Cerambycidae. It was described by Dalman in 1817, originally under the genus Lamia. It is known from the Ivory Coast, Cameroon, Sierra Leone, Gabon, Angola, the Republic of the Congo. It feeds on Coffea canephora.

References

Pachystolini
Beetles described in 1817